Scary Road is Fun is a 2015 Chinese comedy thriller film directed by Samm Chan. It was released on April 17, 2015.

Cast
Johnny Zhang
Michael Tong
He Haoyang
Zhang Weixun
Yao Wenxue
Pan Yanfei
Li Ang
Yang Di
Kingdom Yuen

Reception
By April 27, the film had earned  at the Chinese box office.

References

2010s comedy thriller films
Chinese comedy thriller films
2015 comedy films